Westwood is a historic plantation in Uniontown, Alabama, United States.  The main house was built between 1836 and 1850 by James Lewis Price. It is in the Greek Revival style with some Italianate influence. The outbuildings include a smokehouse with architectural detailing identical to the main house, a carriage house, a dairy, and a cook's quarters. Westwood Plantation was added to the National Register of Historic Places as a historic district  on November 21, 1974. Boundary increases were made to the district on March 15, 1984, and December 10, 1984.

History
James Lewis Price migrated to Perry County in 1835 from his native Richmond, Virginia.  He began building Westwood in 1836, naming it after his grandfather's Virginia home.  His slaves cleared the land and were responsible for the construction of his estate, including the main house.  By 1850 Price had finished work on Westwood, now its sprawling plan was complete with projecting corner pavilions and two-story end loggias with recessed cast-iron porches.  Westwood currently continues to be owned by Price descendants.  The 1860 United States Census of Perry County indicates that James Lewis Price owned 108 slaves in that year.

Gallery

References

National Register of Historic Places in Perry County, Alabama
Houses on the National Register of Historic Places in Alabama
Houses completed in 1850
Greek Revival houses in Alabama
Italianate architecture in Alabama
Plantation houses in Alabama
Houses in Perry County, Alabama
Historic districts in Perry County, Alabama
Historic districts on the National Register of Historic Places in Alabama
Plantations in Alabama
1850 establishments in Alabama